Bahrain competed at the 2011 World Championships in Athletics from August 27 to September 4 in Daegu, South Korea.

Team selection

A team of 11 athletes was
announced to represent the country
in the event.  The team is led by reigning world champions Maryam Yusuf Jamal and Youssef Saad Kamel.   The final team on the entry list comprises the names of 13 athletes.

The following athletes appeared on the preliminary Entry List, but not on the Official Start List of the specific event, resulting in total number of 11 competitors:

All of the athletes on the Bahrain team had undergone a change in nationality in order to compete for Bahrain.

Results

Men

Women

References

External links
Official local organising committee website
Official IAAF competition website

Nations at the 2011 World Championships in Athletics
World Championships in Athletics
Bahrain at the World Championships in Athletics